Religion in Artsakh is characterized by a largely homogeneous Christian population (99%) who overwhelmingly belong to the Armenian Apostolic Church (98%).

History

Arab and Safavid rule 
Islam arrived in Nagorno-Karabakh with Arabs in the seventh century, gradually increasing as Islamic nations ruled the region.

In the sixteenth century, the first shah of the Safavid Dynasty, Ismail I (r. 1486–1524) established Shia Islam as the state religion. The Safavid Dynasty would have a strict policy of enforcing Shia Islam, which would bring political conflict with the Sunnis of the neighbouring Ottoman Empire.

Russian & Soviet rule 
In 1806, Northern Azerbaijan was annexed by the Russian Empire from the Persian Qajar Dynasty, this region also included Nagorno-Karabakh.

In 1918, the Azerbaijan Democratic Republic (1918 - 20) declared independence from Russia during the Russian Civil war. But was promptly incorporated into the Soviet Union in 1920. During the Soviet era, state atheism was enforced, which resulted in all of Nagorno-Karabakh's Churches and Mosques being closed.

Republic of Artsakh 
After the collapse of USSR the First Nagorno-Karabakh War began, during which most of the local Sunni Azeri population was deported by Armenian forces. The remaining Azeries largely emigrated back to Azerbaijan. Today, most of the Armenian population is Christian and belongs to the Armenian Apostolic Church which is an Oriental Orthodox Church. Certain Eastern Orthodox and Evangelical denominations also exist.

Religious places 
See also :Category:Churches in the Republic of Artsakh and List of mosques in Nagorno-Karabakh

References

Republic of Artsakh culture
Nagorno-Karabakh
Republic of Artsakh